Moscow International Model United Nations (MIMUN) is a Model UN in Russia, conducted annually in Moscow State Institute of International Relations (MGIMO – University). It is a combination of a scientific conference and a role play, where university and high school students simulate the work of different UN bodies in several United Nations official languages.


Organizers
Moscow International Model UN is one of the programs of UN Association-Russia and is held in cooperation with MGIMO-University under the aegis of the World Federation of United Nations Associations.

History 

The first Model UN in MGIMO was held in 1999. In 2000 the conference obtained international status and since then Moscow International Model UN has been held regularly.

Structure
During the Moscow International Model UN university and high school students simulate the work of the UN organs. Traditionally General Assembly, Security Council, Economic and Social Council (ECOSOC) and International Court of Justice rank among them. Also, main General Assembly Committees, some ECOSOC functional commissions, Human Rights Council are usually simulated.

Secretariat

Secretariat of Moscow International Model UN works throughout the year. It deals with questions concerning the organization process of Model. Secretariat issues an official printed newspaper of Moscow International Model UN - "Vestnik".

MIMUN 2015

MIMUN 2015 was held from April 19 to April 24, 2015. The conference hosted committees in all the 6 languages: for the first time Spanish, Arabic and Chinese were included.

External links

 Moscow International Model UN official website 
 MGIMO-University official website 

World Federation of United Nations Associations
Moscow State Institute of International Relations